Burski (feminine: Burska; plural: Burscy) is a Polish surname. Notable people with this surname include:

 Adam Burski (ca. 1560–1611), Polish philosopher
 Bogna Burska (born 1974), Polish playwright and visual artist

Polish-language surnames